"Don't Lose Touch" is a song by the Gainesville, Florida-based punk rock band Against Me!, released as the first single from their 2005 album Searching for a Former Clarity. Like the second single "From Her Lips to God's Ears (The Energizer)", it was released exclusively on twelve-inch vinyl with a remixed version of the song as the A-side and the album version as the B-side. The A-side version was remixed by German electronic music duo Mouse on Mars. The single was limited to 3,050 copies.

The music video for "Don't Lose Touch" was directed by Philip Andelman. It depicts the band performing the song in a rehearsal and storage space, with parts shown in reverse.

Track listing

Personnel
 Laura Jane Grace – guitar, lead vocals
 James Bowman  – guitar, backing vocals
 Andrew Seward – bass guitar, backing vocals
 Warren Oakes – drums
 J. Robbins – tambourine, producer, engineer, mixing engineer
 Alan Douches – mastering

References

External links
 "Don't Lose Touch" at Against Me!'s official website – includes links to song lyrics
 "Don't Lose Touch" at Fat Wreck Chords

2005 singles
Against Me! songs
Songs written by Laura Jane Grace
Music videos directed by Philip Andelman
2005 songs
Songs written by James Bowman (musician)
Songs written by Warren Oakes